Don Mitchell may refer to:

Don Mitchell (actor) (1943–2013), American actor best known for his role in the TV series Ironside
Don Mitchell (aircraft designer), designer of the Mitchell Nimbus, Mitchell U-2 Superwing and AmeriPlanes Mitchell Wing A-10
Don Mitchell (geographer) (born 1961), professor of geography at the Maxwell School of Syracuse University
Don Mitchell (politician) (born c. 1951), Canadian politician, mayor of Whitby

See also
Donald Mitchell (disambiguation)